The Wallisellen–Uster–Rapperswil railway line is a railway line in the Swiss canton of Zurich. It is also known as the Glatthalbahn, Glatttalbahn or Glattalbahn (Gl-TB), although the latter name is now more commonly used to refer to the Stadtbahn Glattal, a nearby light rail system.

The line runs from Wallisellen, where it diverges from the Zurich to Winterthur line, to Uster and Rapperswil. A second link from Zurich, via the Zürichberg Tunnel, joins the line just before Dübendorf, and both routes are used by through trains from Zurich. The line also has junctions with the Effretikon to Hinwil line, at Wetzikon, and the Tösstalbahn, at Rüti. At Rapperswil, it connects with the Lake Zurich right bank line, the Rapperswil to Ziegelbrücke line, and the Südostbahn over the Seedamm.

The name Glattalbahn is German for Glattal railway, or Glatt valley railway. The river Glatt is a tributary of the river Rhine flowing from Greifensee lake to Glattfelden in Switzerland.

History
The original section of the railway line from Wallisellen to Uster was opened in 1856 by the Glatttalbahn company. That company was taken over by the Vereinigte Schweizerbahnen (VSB) one year later in 1857, and that company extended the line to Rapperswil. The VSB was in turn taken over by the Swiss Federal Railways (SBB) in 1902. The original roundhouse at Uster railway station is preserved.

At Bubikon, the Wallisellen to Rapperswil line was crossed by the former Uerikon to Bauma railway (UeBB). The section of this line from Bubikon in the direction of Bauma was closed in 1948 and little now remains. The line towards Uerikon was largely closed at the same time, but a short stretch is still in use as a siding.

Operation
Today the line carries trains of the Zurich S-Bahn and freight traffic.

The line is double track from Wallisellen to Uster, and is then single track with shorter stretches of double track between Aathal and Wetzikon, Bubikon and Rüti, and Jona and Rapperswil.

Whilst no single S-Bahn line traverses the full length of the line from Wallisellen to Rapperswil, no fewer than six lines traverse some part of the line, providing a high frequency of service to many stations.

The following lines operate:

See also
List of railway companies in Switzerland

References

External links

Lok Remise Uster page in German on the roundhouse at Uster

Railway lines in Switzerland
Railway lines opened in 1856
1856 establishments in Switzerland
Swiss Federal Railways lines
15 kV AC railway electrification